Hulstina is a genus of moths in the family Geometridae erected by Harrison Gray Dyar Jr. in 1903.

Species
 Hulstina aridata Barnes & Benjamin, 1929
 Hulstina exhumata (Swett, 1918)
 Hulstina formosata (Hulst, 1896)
 Hulstina grossbecki Rindge, 1970
 Hulstina imitatrix Rindge, 1970
 Hulstina nevadaria Brown, 1998
 Hulstina tanycraeros Rindge, 1970
 Hulstina wrightiaria (Hulst, 1888)
 Hulstina xera Rindge, 1970

References

Geometridae